Cornelia M. van Duijn (born 1962) is a Dutch epidemiologist. She is Professor of Epidemiology at Nuffield Department of Population Health and a Fellow of St Cross College, Oxford.

Life
Cornelia van Duijn studied human nutrition and mathematical statistics at the Agricultural University of Wageningen, and genetics and epidemiology at Erasmus University Medical School.

In June 2020 she became a Fellow of the Academy of Medical Sciences.

References

1962 births
Living people
Dutch epidemiologists
Fellows of St Cross College, Oxford
Fellows of the Academy of Medical Sciences (United Kingdom)
Erasmus University Rotterdam alumni
Women epidemiologists